Edwin "Puruco" Nolasco Coliseum (Spanish: Coliseo Edwin "Puruco" Nolasco) is an indoor sporting arena located in Coamo, Puerto Rico. The coliseum opened in 1985 and was renovated in 1999.

The coliseum's seating capacity is 5,000 seats. It is used mostly for basketball as the home arena of the Maratonistas de Coamo.

External links
Official Website of Coamo Municipality
Baloncesto Superior Nacional
Picture of Puruco Nolasco Coliseum

Coamo, Puerto Rico
Indoor arenas in Puerto Rico
Basketball venues in Puerto Rico
1985 establishments in Puerto Rico
Sports venues completed in 1985